During the 2008-09 Season, Legia Warsaw participated in the Polish first division, the Ekstraklasa.

Transfers

In

Out

Squad
As of 18 February 2009.

Match results

Friendlies

Ekstraklasa

Polish Super Cup

Polish Cup

Puchar Ligi

UEFA Cup

Player statistics

Last Update: Start of 2008/09 season
Data includes all competitions

Top scorers
As of 2008/09 Season

Most assists
As of 2008/09 Season

Most appearances
As of 2008/09 Season

References 

Polish football clubs 2008–09 season
2008-09